Estrellitas y Duendes (English: Little Stars and Goblins) is a song by Dominican Republic singer-songwriter Juan Luis Guerra released as the fifth single for his album Bachata Rosa (1990). It was released in 1991 by Karem Records. The track is a Bachata with elements of Bolero. It reached the top-ten on the US Billboard Hot Latin Songs and his native Dominican Republic. A live version of the track was later included on Coleccion Romantica (2001).

Tracklist 

 Colombia 7", 45 RPM Single
 Estrellitas y Duendes – 4:28
 A Pedir Su Mano – 4:51

Charts

References 

1991 songs
Juan Luis Guerra songs
Songs written by Juan Luis Guerra
1991 singles